Foudre was an amphibious assault ship of the Marine Nationale, the twelfth vessel to bear the name, and lead ship of the s. In December 2011 the vessel was sold to the Chilean Navy and renamed Sargento Aldea.

Service history

Marine Nationale
Foudre served during the war in Yugoslavia, and was the central element of Opération Licorne in Côte d'Ivoire.

On 17 January 2009, [[2009 Gabonese Eurocopter AS 532 crash|one of Foudre'''s helicopters crashed]] off the coast of Gabon, killing eight French military personnel.

Sale and Chilean Navy service
In October 2011 it was announced that Chile and France had finalized negotiations for sale of Foudre to Chile for around USD80 million. She was transferred to Chile on 23 December 2011 and renamed Sargento Aldea''.

See also
 Juan de Dios Aldea

References

Further reading

External links 

  TCD Foudre TCD Foudre

Foudre class landing platform dock
1988 ships
Ships built in France